The First Pavlov State Medical University of St. Petersburg (ПСПбГМУ им. акад. И. П. Павлова) is a medical school located in St. Petersburg.

History 

The Pavlov First Saint Petersburg State Medical University was founded in 1897 as the Medical Institute for Women. It was the first European medical school to admit women.

The University has changed names several times since then: It became known as The First Medical Institute of Leningrad in 1924. In 1936, the institute was renamed in honor of Nobel Prize winner Ivan Pavlov. In 1994, the institute was reorganized as a medical university.

In the 1930s, the Institute of Chemistry and Pharmacy and the Institute of Pediatrics were spun off as independent institutions. In the 1990s, a number of departments evolved into research institutes.

Research 
Pavlov First Saint Petersburg State Medical University houses a number of research institutes:

 Nephrology Research Institute
 Research Institute of Pulmonology
 Raisa Gorbacheva Memorial Research Institute of Children's Oncology, Hematology and Transplantation
 Maxillo-facial Surgery and Dentistry Research Institute
 Valdman Institute of  Pharmacology
 Heart and Vascular Research Institute
 Regional Research Centre of Neurobiology and Psychopharmacology
 Scientific and Methodological Center for Molecular Medicine Russian Federation
 Centre of early phases of clinical trials

Faculties 

 Faculty of Medicine
 Faculty of Dentistry
 Faculty of Sports Medicine
 Faculty of Adapted Physical Education
 Faculty of Pediatrics
 Faculty of Clinical Psychology
 Faculty for International student
 Faculty of Graduate Education in Nursing
 Institute of Nursing
 Faculty of Postgraduate Education
 Faculty of Pre-University Course

Notable alumni 

 Pyotr Anokhin (1898-1974), biologist and physiologist, author of Theory of Functional Systems
Natalia Bekhtereva (1924-2008), neuroscientist and psychologist who developed neurophysiological approaches to psychology
Marta Helena Nobel-Oleinikoff (1881-1973), physician and philanthropist and member of the Nobel family
Alexander Rosenbaum doctor, poet, composer, singer and actor
Yelena Bonner (1923-2011), human rights activist
Vasily Aksyonov (1932-2009), a writer of novels
Ilya Averbakh (1934-1986), film director, screenwriter
Sofiya Lisovskaia, Russian urologist
Tumani Corrah, Gambian clinician scientist researching tuberculosis, HIV, and malaria
Olha Kosach-Kryvyniuk (1877-1945), Ukrainian physician, writer, and translator
Gulsum Asfendiyarova (1880-1937), one of the first Kazakh woman medical doctors

See also 
 List of higher education and academic institutions in Saint Petersburg

References

External links 
 Official home page
Medstudies

Universities in Saint Petersburg
Medical schools in Russia
Educational institutions established in 1897
1897 establishments in the Russian Empire